William McCormick "Bill" Blair Jr. (October 24, 1916 – August 29, 2015) was an American diplomat who served as United States Ambassador to Denmark from 1961 to 1964 and as United States Ambassador to the Philippines from 1964 until 1967. A lawyer, he also was a close associate of Adlai Stevenson II. He was awarded an honorary Doctor of Laws (L.L. D.) degree from Whittier College in 1964.

Early life
Blair was a son of Helen Hadduck (Bowen) and William M. Blair, who co-founded the investment banking firm William Blair & Company. He graduated from the Groton School in 1935, Stanford University, and the University of Virginia Law School in 1947.

Personal life
On September 9, 1961, in the chapel at Frederiksborg Castle in Hillerød, Denmark, Ambassador Blair married Catherine "Deeda" Gerlach (born 1931), the former wife of oleomargarine heir Charles Clarke Jelke and the only daughter of Norman Harbridge Gerlach (1904–1980), a partner in the Chicago law firm Gerlach & O'Brien, and his wife, the former Joanna Powell. Deeda Blair (who was later a subject of portraits by Andy Warhol) was named director and vice-president of the Lasker Foundation in 1965 and is a noted advocate for public health issues.

The couple had one child, a son named William McCormick Blair III, who committed suicide in May 2004 at age 41. After their son's death, they relocated from Washington, D.C. to New York City. He died on August 29, 2015 at his home in Manhattan at the age of 98.

Family tree

References

External links
United States Department of State: Ambassadors to Denmark
United States Department of State: Ambassadors to the Philippines
PoliticalGraveyard - William McCormick Blair
SmokersHistory bio page on the Blairs
SmokersHistory bio on Blair Sr.
 

1916 births
2015 deaths
McCormick family
Ambassadors of the United States to Denmark
American financial businesspeople
Ambassadors of the United States to the Philippines
Place of birth missing
Groton School alumni
Stanford University alumni
20th-century American diplomats